Carl-Ebbe Andersen (19 January 1929 – 14 June 2009) was a Danish rower who competed in the 1948 Summer Olympics. He was born in Roskilde. In 1948 he was the coxswain of the Danish boat which won the gold medal in the coxed pair event.

References

1929 births
2009 deaths
Danish male rowers
Coxswains (rowing)
Olympic rowers of Denmark
Rowers at the 1948 Summer Olympics
Olympic gold medalists for Denmark
Olympic medalists in rowing
People from Roskilde
Medalists at the 1948 Summer Olympics
European Rowing Championships medalists
Sportspeople from Region Zealand